Besnik is an Albanian masculine given name, which means loyal or faithful. People named Besnik include:

Besnik Bekteshi (born 1941), Albanian politician 
Besnik Bisha (born 1958), Albanian film director and actor
Besnik Dushaj (born 19??), Albanian politician
Besnik Hasi (born 1971), Kosovar-Albanian footballer and manager
Besnik Krasniqi (born 1990), Kosovar-Albanian footballer
Besnik Musaj (born 1973), Albanian cyclist
Besnik Mustafaj (born 1958), Albanian writer and diplomat
Besnik Prenga (born 1969), Albanian footballer
Besnik Zukaj (born 1978), Serbian footballer of Albanian origin

Albanian masculine given names